The Chicago–Purdue football rivalry is a now defunct American college football rivalry between the Chicago Maroons and Purdue Boilermakers. Chicago leads the series 27–14–1. The series was first played in 1892. The rivalry has not been played since 1936.

Game results

See also  
 List of NCAA college football rivalry games

References

College football rivalries in the United States
Big Ten Conference rivalries
Chicago Maroons football
Purdue Boilermakers football
Dissolved sports rivalries